Walter Jon Williams (born October 28, 1953) is an American writer, primarily of science fiction. Previously he wrote nautical adventure fiction under the name Jon Williams, in particular, Privateers and Gentlemen (1981–1984), a series of historical novels set during the Age of Sail.

Career
Writing as Jon Williams, he designed the wargame Tradition of Victory and role-playing game Promotions and Prizes, which were republished by Fantasy Games Unlimited as Heart of Oak (1982) and Privateers and Gentlemen (1983). A role-playing game sourcebook for Cyberpunk called Hardwired (1989) was licensed by R. Talsorian Games, based on the 1986 novel of the same name by Williams.

Williams was born in Duluth, Minnesota and graduated from the University of New Mexico, where he received his BA degree in 1975. He currently lives in Valencia County, south of Albuquerque in New Mexico.

In 2006, Williams founded the Taos Toolbox, a two-week writer's workshop for fantasy and science fiction writers.

In 2017, Williams was the Guest of Honor at the 75th World Science Fiction Convention, held in Helsinki.

Publications

Novels 
 Hardwired series
 Hardwired (1986)
 Solip:System (1989; novelette released as a standalone book)
 Voice of the Whirlwind (1987)
 Drake Maijstral seriesAn SF comedy of manners series about the aristocratic burglar Drake Maijstral. Collected as an omnibus, Ten Points for Style (1995)
 The Crown Jewels (1987)
 House of Shards (1988)
 Rock of Ages (1995)

 Metropolitan series
 Metropolitan (1995), Nebula Award nominee
 City on Fire (1997), Hugo Award nominee; Nebula Award nominee
 Dread Empire's Fall seriesA military science fiction/space opera series.
 The Praxis (2002)
 The Sundering (2003)
 Conventions of War (2005)
 Investments (2008), novella
 Impersonations (2016)
 The Accidental War (2018)
 Fleet Elements (2020)
 Imperium Restored (2022)
 Privateers and Gentlemen series, as Jon Williams
 To Glory Arise, originally The Privateer (1981)
 The Tern Schooner, originally The Yankee (1981)
 Brig of War, originally The Raider (1981)
 The Macedonian (1981)
 Cat Island (1981)
 Dagmar Shaw seriesA sci-fi thriller series involving crowdsourcing and alternate reality games.
 This Is Not a Game (2009)
 Deep State (2011)
 The Fourth Wall (2012)
 "Diamonds from Tequila" (2014), short story published in Rogues

 Quillifer series
 Quillifer (2017)
 Quillifer The Knight (2019)
 Lord Quillifer (2022)
 Other novels
 Ambassador of Progress (1984)
 Knight Moves (1985), Philip K. Dick Award nominee
 Angel Station (1989)
 Elegy for Angels and Dogs (1990)
 Days of Atonement (1991)
 Aristoi (1992)
 The Rift (1999), as by Walter J. Williams
 The New Jedi Order: Destiny's Way (2002)
 Implied Spaces (2008)

Short fiction collections 
 Facets (1990)
 Frankensteins and Foreign Devils (1998)
 The Green Leopard Plague and Other Stories (Trade Hardcover: Night Shade Books, 2010)

Notable short fiction 

 "Dinosaurs" (1987), Hugo Award nominee
 "Witness" (1987), Nebula Award nominee
 "Surfacing" (1988), Hugo Award and Nebula Award nominee
 "Erogenoscape" (1991)
 "Prayers on the Wind" (1991), Nebula Award nominee
 "Wall, Stone, Craft" (1993), Hugo Award and Nebula Award nominee
 "Red Elvis" (1994) (collected in Mike Resnick's alternate history anthology Alternate Outlaws)
 "Foreign Devils" in War of the Worlds: Global Dispatches (1996), Sidewise Award for Alternate History winner
 "Lethe" (1999), Nebula Award nominee
 "Daddy's World" (2000), Nebula Award winner
 "Argonautica" (2001), Nebula Award nominee
 "The Last Ride of German Freddie", in Worlds That Weren't (2002), Sidewise Award for Alternate History nominee
 "The Tang Dynasty Underwater Pyramid" (2004)
 "The Green Leopard Plague" (2004), Nebula Award winner, Hugo Award nominee
 "Prompt. Professional. Pop!: A Tor.Com Original" (2014)

References

External links
  with blog
 
Critical profile and bibliography in The Encyclopedia of Science Fiction
 
 Walter Jon Williams discussion at theforce.net Message Boards
 Interview on Bibliophile Stalker
 Practice for Something Else: Walter Jon Williams, Interview by Jeremy L. C. Jones, Clarkesworld Magazine, January 2011
 Interview With a Writer: Science Fiction Writer Walter Jon Williams, Interview by Tom Chandler, Writer Underground blog, April 2011
 
 Jon Williams at LC Authorities – undifferentiated name; 6 of 7 catalog records belong to this Jon Williams
 Jon Williams at WorldCat (Privateers and Gentlemen, among works by other Jon Williams)

1953 births
20th-century American novelists
21st-century American novelists
20th-century American short story writers
21st-century American short story writers
American fantasy writers
American male novelists
American male short story writers
American people of Finnish descent
American science fiction writers
American thriller writers
Living people
Nautical historical novelists
Nebula Award winners
Role-playing game designers
Sidewise Award winners
University of New Mexico alumni
20th-century American male writers
21st-century American male writers
People from Los Lunas, New Mexico